Tytthonyx is a genus of soldier beetles in the family Cantharidae. There are about 19 described species in Tytthonyx.

Species
These 19 species belong to the genus Tytthonyx:

 Tytthonyx bicolor LeConte, 1885
 Tytthonyx cubanus Leng & Mutchler
 Tytthonyx dierkensi Constantin, 2012
 Tytthonyx erythrocephala
 Tytthonyx erythrocephalus (Fabricius, 1801)
 Tytthonyx flavicollis Blatchley, 1920
 Tytthonyx furtivus Blatchley, 1924
 Tytthonyx geiseri (Poinar & Fanti, 2016)
 Tytthonyx guadeloupensis (Fleutiaux & Sallé, 1889)
 Tytthonyx guanaensis Wittmer
 Tytthonyx hintoni Delkeskamp, 1977-01
 Tytthonyx insularis Wittmer
 Tytthonyx martiniquensis Constantin, 2012
 Tytthonyx oaxacaensis Zaragoza-Caballero, 2001
 Tytthonyx perezi Zaragoza-Caballero, 2001
 Tytthonyx puertoricanus Wittmer
 Tytthonyx ruficollis Schaeffer, 1904
 Tytthonyx rufiventris
 Tytthonyx virginensis Wittmer

References

Further reading

 
 

Cantharidae
Articles created by Qbugbot